Lessness Heath is a district in the London Borough of Bexley, in the area of Belvedere.

History and name
Lessness was recorded in the Domesday Book in 1086, as the largest settlement in the Hundred of Litlelee in Kent and contained 68 households at that time.

The name of Lessness Heath has changed over the centuries. It was recorded as Leosne in the mid 11th century, Lesneis and Loisnes in 1086 in the Domesday Book, Hlosness in the late 11th century and Lesnes in 1194. At around 1762, Emanuel Bowen recorded the place as Leesing on one of his maps, then in 1805 an Ordnance Survey map recorded it as Lesness Heath. It has been suggested the name may be from an Old English word hlēosne, the plural of hlēosn meaning 'Burial mound' or 'shelter', later possibly adding the word næss meaning 'headland' to the end.

Lessness Heath gave its name to the ancient hundred, the Hundred of Lessness, and was the meeting place for residents of the hundred to discuss matters. In 1178, the Abbey of St Mary and St Thomas the Martyr at Lesnes, Lesnes Abbey, was founded near Lessness Heath and named after it.

Education

Nearest places
Abbey Wood
Belvedere
Bexleyheath
West Heath

See also
Lesnes Abbey

References

Districts of the London Borough of Bexley
Areas of London